Evan Michael O'Dorney (born September 16, 1993) is an American mathematician who is a Visiting Assistant Professor at the University of Notre Dame as of 2021. As a home-schooled high school student and college student, he won many contests in mathematics and other subjects, including the 2007 Scripps National Spelling Bee, 2011 Intel Science Talent Search, four International Math Olympiad medals, and three Putnam Fellowships. A 2013 report by the National Research Council called him "as famous for academic excellence as any student can be".

Education and competitions
As a home-schooled high school student, O'Dorney attended classes at the University of California, Berkeley from 2007 to 2011. He was the winner of the 2007 Scripps National Spelling Bee, 
and an interview O'Dorney did on CNN with Kiran Chetry after he won the Scripps Spelling Bee later became a viral video in which he misspelled the word scombridae. During this time he was a four-time International Math Olympiad medalist, with two gold and two silver medals. 

In 2010, he won $10,000 (half for himself and half for the Berkeley Mathematics Circle) in a national "Who Wants to Be a Mathematician" contest, held at that year's Joint Mathematics Meetings in San Francisco. In 2011, he won the Intel Science Talent Search for a project entitled "continued fraction convergents and linear fractional transformations".

O'Dorney started attending Harvard College in 2011, where he studied mathematics. He jumped straight into graduate classes in mathematics, avoiding the undergraduate-level classes. While at Harvard, he was a three-time Putnam fellow. (His first Putnam was as a high school student.)  In 2015–16, he studied Part III of the Mathematical Tripos at Cambridge, on a Churchill Scholarship. In 2016 he received honorable mention for the Morgan Prize in mathematics. 

In 2021, he received a PhD in mathematics from Princeton University.

Other interests
Although his primary interest is mathematics, O'Dorney has had a strong interest in music. At Harvard, he studied music as well as mathematics, and continued to compose music, as well as singing in a chamber music group and playing the organ and piano. He has absolute pitch.

References

1993 births
Alumni of Churchill College, Cambridge
21st-century American mathematicians
Harvard College alumni
International Mathematical Olympiad participants
Living people
People from Danville, California
Putnam Fellows
Scripps National Spelling Bee participants
University of California, Berkeley people
Princeton University alumni